Osvaldo Miranda may refer to:
 Osvaldo Miranda (footballer) (born 1984), Argentine footballer
 Osvaldo Miranda (actor) (1915–2011), Argentine actor
 Osvaldo Miranda (fencer) (1887–?), Cuban fencer